George Grub was an Anglican priest in the early 20th century.

Grub was educated at Aberdeen University and ordained in 1871. He was a curate at St Paul's Dundee and then held incumbencies at St James's  Stonehaven and Holy Trinity, Ayr before his appointment at St Ninian's. He died on 5 October 1924

References

1844 births
1924 deaths
Alumni of the University of Aberdeen
Provosts of St Ninian's Cathedral, Perth